"Run" is a song by English singer Becky Hill and Swedish production duo Galantis. The song was released on 25 February 2022 by record labels Polydor Records and Eko Records. The song was also featured on the deluxe version of Hill's debut album, Only Honest on the Weekend (2021).

Commercial performance

"Run" entered the UK Singles Charts at number 34 on 10 March 2022 (week ending), before peaking at number 21 in its sixth week on the charts. The song became Hill's 14th and Galantis' seventh top 40 single. "Run" additionally entered the top 40 in Ireland and the top 20 of the Billboard Dance/Electronic Songs chart at number 17.

Charts

Weekly charts

Year-end charts

Certifications

References

2022 singles
2022 songs
Becky Hill songs
Galantis songs
Polydor Records singles
Songs written by Becky Hill
Songs written by MNEK
Songs written by Christian Karlsson (DJ)